Thorolf is an Old Norse masculine personal name. It means "Thor's wolf." Notable people with the name include:

Thorolf Kveldulfsson, 9th century Norwegian hersir and Viking
Thorolf Skallagrimsson, Icelandic Viking and nephew of the former

Norwegian masculine given names